Gunsmoke is an American radio and television Western drama series created by director Norman Macdonnell and writer John Meston. It centers on Dodge City, Kansas, in the 1870s, during the settlement of the American West. The central character is lawman Marshal Matt Dillon, played by William Conrad on radio and James Arness on television.

The radio series ran from 1952 to 1961. John Dunning wrote that among radio drama enthusiasts, "Gunsmoke is routinely placed among the best shows of any kind and any time." It ran unsponsored for its first few years, with CBS funding its production.

In 1955, the series was adapted for television and ran for 20 seasons. From 1955 to 1961, it ran in half hour episodes, and one hour episodes from 1962 to 1975.  A total of 635 episodes were aired over it's 20 year run.  At the end of its run in 1975, Los Angeles Times columnist Cecil Smith wrote: "Gunsmoke was the dramatization of the American epic legend of the west. Our own Iliad and Odyssey, created from standard elements of the dime novel and the pulp Western as romanticized by [Ned] Buntline, [Bret] Harte, and [Mark] Twain. It was ever the stuff of legend."

Following its regular television series run, five made-for-tv movies were produced.

The show won 15 Primetime Emmy awards as well as other accolades.  It was frequently well received, holding a top-10 spot in the Nielsen ratings for several seasons.

When aired in the United Kingdom, the television series was initially titled Gun Law, later reverting to Gunsmoke.

Radio series (1952–1961) 

In the late 1940s, CBS chairman William S. Paley, a fan of the Philip Marlowe radio series, asked his programming chief, Hubell Robinson, to develop a hardcore Western series, about a "Philip Marlowe of the Old West". Robinson delegated this to his West Coast CBS vice president, Harry Ackerman, who had developed the Philip Marlowe series.

Ackerman and his scriptwriters, Mort Fine and David Friedkin, created an audition script called "Mark Dillon Goes to Gouge Eye" based on one of their Michael Shayne radio scripts, "The Case of the Crooked Wheel", from mid-1948. Two versions were recorded. The first, recorded in June 1949, was very much like a hardcore detective series and starred Michael Rye (credited as Rye Billsbury) as Dillon; the second, recorded in July 1949, starred Straight Arrow actor Howard Culver in a more Western, lighter version of the same script. CBS liked the Culver version better, and Ackerman was told to proceed.

A complication arose when Culver's contract as the star of Straight Arrow would not allow him to do another Western series. The project was suspended for three years, when producer Norman Macdonnell and writer John Meston discovered it while creating an adult Western series of their own.

Macdonnell and Meston wanted to create a radio Western for adults, in contrast to the prevailing juvenile fare such as The Lone Ranger and The Cisco Kid. Gunsmoke was set in Dodge City, Kansas, during the thriving cattle days of the 1870s. Dunning notes, "The show drew critical acclaim for unprecedented realism."

Episodes

Cast 
The radio series first aired on CBS on April 26, 1952, with the episode "Billy the Kid", written by Walter Newman, and ended on June 18, 1961. The show stars William Conrad as Marshal Matt Dillon, Howard McNear as Doc Charles Adams, Georgia Ellis as Kitty Russell, and Parley Baer as Dillon's assistant, Chester Wesley Proudfoot.

Matt Dillon 

Matt Dillon was played on radio by William Conrad and on TV by James Arness. Two versions of the same pilot episode titled "Mark Dillon Goes to Gouge Eye" were produced with Rye Billsbury and Howard Culver playing Marshal Mark Dillon as the lead, not yet played by Conrad. Conrad was one of the last actors to audition for the role of Marshal Dillon. With a resonantly powerful and distinctive voice, Conrad was already one of radio's busiest actors. Though Meston championed him, Macdonnell thought Conrad might be overexposed. During his audition, however, Conrad won over Macdonnell after reading only a few lines. Dillon, as portrayed by Conrad, was a lonely, isolated man, toughened by a hard life. Macdonnell later claimed, "Much of Matt Dillon's character grew out of Bill Conrad."

Meston relished the upending of cherished Western fiction clichés and said that few Westerns gave any inkling of how brutal the Old West was in reality. Many episodes were based on man's cruelty to man and woman, in as much as the prairie woman's life and the painful treatment of women as chattels were touched on well ahead of the time of most media. As originally pitched to CBS executives, this was to be an adult Western, not a grown-up Hopalong Cassidy.

Dunning writes that Meston was especially disgusted by the archetypal Western hero and set out "to destroy [that type of] character he loathed". In Meston's view, "Dillon was almost as scarred as the homicidal psychopaths who drifted into Dodge from all directions."

Doc Adams 
Howard McNear starred as Dr. Charles Adams in the radio series, and Milburn Stone portrayed Dr. Galen Adams in the television version. In the radio series, "Doc" Adams was initially a self-interested and somewhat dark character with a predilection for constantly attempting to increase his revenue through the procurement of autopsy fees. He was acerbic, somewhat mercenary, and borderline alcoholic, in the program's early years. His real name was Dr. Calvin Moore. He came west and changed his name to escape a charge of murder. However, McNear's performances steadily became more warm-hearted and sympathetic. Doc wandered throughout the territories until he settled in Dodge City 17 years later under the name of Charles Adams. Conrad borrowed the surname from cartoonist Charles Addams as a testament to Doc's initially ghoulish comportment. Milburn Stone was given free rein to choose the character's first name, and chose that of the ancient Greek physician and medical researcher Galen.

Miss Kitty 
Kitty was played by actress Georgia Ellis on radio, and by Amanda Blake on TV. Ellis first appeared in the radio episode "Billy the Kid" (April 26, 1952) as "Francie Richards" – a former girlfriend of Matt Dillon's and the widow of a criminal, but the character of "Miss Kitty" did not appear until the May 10, 1952, episode "Jaliscoe". Sometime in 1959, Ellis was billed as Georgia Hawkins instead of Georgia Ellis. Amanda Blake appeared in over 500 episodes of the television series, with her last being the April 1, 1974, episode titled, "The Disciple".

In the radio series, Kitty's profession was hinted at, but never explicit; in a 1953 interview with Time, Macdonnell declared, "Kitty is just someone Matt has to visit every once in a while". The magazine observed that she is "obviously not selling chocolate bars". The television show first portrayed Kitty as a saloon dance hall employee, then from season two, episode 36 ("Daddy-O"), as half-owner of the Long Branch Saloon.

Dillon and Kitty clearly have a close personal relationship. In a July 2, 2002, Associated Press interview with Bob Thomas, Arness explained, "If they were man and wife, it would make a lot of difference. The people upstairs decided it was better to leave the show as it was, which I totally agreed with."

Distinction from other radio Westerns 

Gunsmoke is often a somber program, particularly in its early years. Dunning writes that Dillon "played his hand and often lost. He arrived too late to prevent a lynching. He amputated a dying man's leg and lost the patient anyway. He saved a girl from brutal rapists, then found himself unable to offer her what she needed to stop her from moving into ... life as a prostitute." Some listeners, such as Dunning, argue the radio version was more realistic. Episodes were aimed at adults with some of the most explicit content of their time, including violent crimes, scalpings, massacres, and opium addicts. Many episodes end on a somber note, and villains often get away with their crimes.

The program was set after the arrival of the railroad in Dodge City (1872) and Kansas had been a state since 1861. In reality, a U.S. Marshal (actually a deputy marshal, because only the senior officer in the district holds the title "marshal") would not be based in Dodge City and would not be involved in local law enforcement.

Apart from the doleful tone, Gunsmoke is distinct from other radio Westerns, as the dialogue is often slow and halting, and the outstanding sound effects give a palpable sense of the prairie setting. The effects are subtle but multilayered, giving the show a spacious feel. John Dunning wrote, "The listener heard extraneous dialogue in the background, just above the muted shouts of kids playing in an alley. He heard noises from the next block, too, where the inevitable dog was barking."

Gunsmoke is unique from other Westerns in that it was unsponsored in the first few years of production. The program was funded by CBS in the first two years. Series producers said that if the show were sponsored, they would have to "clean the show up". The producers wanted to find a sponsor that would allow them to keep the show the way it was.

Television proposal 
Not long after the radio show began, talk began of adapting it to television. Privately, Macdonnell had a guarded interest in taking the show to television, but publicly, he declared, "our show is perfect for radio", and he feared, as Dunning writes, "Gunsmoke confined by a picture could not possibly be as authentic or attentive to detail. ... In the end, CBS simply took it away from Macdonnell and began preparing for the television version."

Conrad and the others were given auditions, but they were little more than token effortsespecially in Conrad's case, due to his obesity. However, Meston was kept as the main writer. In the early years, most of the TV episodes were adapted from the radio scripts, often using identical scenes and dialogue. Dunning wrote, "That radio fans considered the TV show a sham and its players impostors should surprise no one. That the TV show was not a sham is due in no small part to the continued strength of Meston's scripts."

Macdonnell and Meston continued the radio version of Gunsmoke until 1961, making it one of the most enduring vintage radio dramas.

Conrad directed two television episodes, in 1963 and 1971, and McNear appeared on six, playing characters other than Doc, including three times as storekeeper Howard Rudd.

Television series (1955–1975) and TV movies 

The TV series ran from September 10, 1955, to March 31, 1975, on CBS, with 635 total episodes. It is the second Western television series written for adults, premiering on September 10, 1955, four days after The Life and Legend of Wyatt Earp. The first 12 seasons aired Saturdays at 10 pm, seasons 13 through 16 aired Mondays at 7:30 pm, and the last four seasons aired Mondays at 8 pm. During its second season in 1956, the program joined the list of the top-10 television programs broadcast in the United States. It quickly moved to number one and stayed there until 1961. It remained among the top-20 programs until 1964.

Transition from radio to TV 
When Gunsmoke was adapted for television in 1955, contrary to a campaign to persuade the network, the network was not interested in bringing either Conrad or his radio costars to the television medium. Conrad's weight was rumored to be a deciding factor. Denver Pyle was also considered for the role, as was Raymond Burr, who was ultimately also seen as too heavy for the part. Charles Warren, television Gunsmokes first director, said, "His voice was fine, but he was too big. When he stood up, his chair stood with him." It has long been rumored that John Wayne was offered the role of Matt Dillon; according to Dennis Weaver's comments on the 50th Anniversary DVD, disc one, episode "Hack Prine", John Wayne was never even considered for the role; to have done so would have been preposterous, since Wayne was a top movie leading man. The belief that Wayne was asked to star is disputed by Warren. Although he agrees Wayne encouraged Arness to take the role, Warren says, "I hired Jim Arness on the strength of a picture he's done for me ... I never thought for a moment of offering it to Wayne."

According to Thomas "Duke" Miller, a TV and movie celebrity expert, this story was told to him by legendary actor James Stewart: "Jimmy said he was in the office with Charles Warren when Mr. Wayne came in. Mr. Warren asked Wayne if he knew James Arness, and Mr. Wayne said yes. Mr. Warren told Mr. Wayne about the transition of the show from radio to TV, and Mr. Wayne readily agreed that James Arness would be a terrific choice for the part of Matt Dillon. I have no reason to doubt the story, because Jimmy absolutely knew everybody."

In the end, the primary roles were all recast, with Arness as Marshal Matt Dillon (on the recommendation of Wayne, who also introduced the pilot), Dennis Weaver as Chester Goode, Milburn Stone as Dr. G. "Doc" Adams (later Galen "Doc" Adams), and Amanda Blake as Miss Kitty Russell. Macdonnell became the associate producer of the TV show and later the producer. Meston was head writer.

The series was filmed at the present site of California Lutheran University (CLU) and nearby Wildwood Regional Park in Thousand Oaks, California.

In 1975, CBS made the decision not to renew Gunsmoke for a 21st season, without making any public announcement or informing the producers or cast members ahead of time. The entire cast was stunned by the cancellation, as they were unaware that CBS was considering it. According to Arness, "We didn't do a final, wrap-up show. We finished the 20th year, we all expected to go on for another season, or two or three. The (network) never told anybody they were thinking of cancelling." The cast and crew read the news in the trade papers. This seemed to have been a habit of CBS. Three other popular shows, Gilligan's Island, Lost in Space, and The Incredible Hulk, met the same abrupt fate.

Cast

 U.S. Marshal Matt Dillon (1955–1975): James Arness
 Galen "Doc" Adams (1955–1975): Milburn Stone
 Kathleen "Kitty" Russell (1955–1974): Amanda Blake
 Chester B. Goode (1955–1964): Dennis Weaver
 Festus Haggen (1964–1975): Ken Curtis

Chester and Festus Haggen are Dillon's sidekicks, though others became acting deputies for - to -year stints: Quint Asper (Burt Reynolds) (1962–65), Thad Greenwood (Roger Ewing) (1965–67), and Newly O'Brien (Buck Taylor) (1967–75), who served as both back-up deputy and doctor-in-training, having some studies in medicine through his uncle, which then continued under Doc Adams. Initially on the fringes of Dodge society, Festus Haggen was slowly phased in as a reliable sidekick and part-time deputy to Matt Dillon when Reynolds left in 1965. When Milburn Stone temporarily left for heart bypass surgery in 1971, Pat Hingle played Dr. John Chapman for several episodes.
 Sam Noonan (bartender; 1955–1959): Bert Rumsey
 Clem (bartender; 1959–1961): Clem Fuller
 Sam Noonan (bartender; 1961–1973): Glenn Strange
 Jim Buck (stage driver; 1957–1962) and Floyd (bartender; 1974–75): Robert Brubaker
 Quint Asper (blacksmith; 1962–1965): Burt Reynolds
 Deputy Marshal Clayton Thaddeus "Thad" Greenwood (1965–1967): Roger Ewing
 Newly O'Brian (gunsmith/Deputy Marshal; 1967–1975): Buck Taylor
 Wilbur Jonas (storekeeper, 1955–1963): Dabbs Greer
 Howie Uzzell (hotel clerk, 1955–1975): Howard Culver
 Moss Grimmick (stableman; 1955–1963): George Selk
 Bill Pence (Long Branch owner/co-owner 1955?–56–?): Judson Pratt
 Bill Pence, (1958–1961): Barney Phillips
 Jim Buck (stagecoach driver; 1957–1962): Robert Brubaker
 Louie Pheeters (town drunk; 1961–1970): James Nusser
 Ma Smalley (boardinghouse owner; 1961–1972): Sarah Selby
 Hank Miller (stableman; 1963–1975): Hank Patterson
 Mr. Bodkin (banker; 1963–1970): Roy Roberts
 Barney Danches (telegraph agent; 1965–1974): Charles Seel
 Roy (townsperson; 1965–1969): Roy Barcroft
 Halligan (rancher; 1966–1975): Charles Wagenheim
 Mr. Lathrop (storekeeper; 1966–1975): Woody Chambliss
 Nathan Burke (freight agent; 1966–1975): Ted Jordan
 Percy Crump (undertaker; 1966–1972): Kelton Garwood (also credited as Jonathan Harper)
 Ed O'Connor (rancher; 1968–1972): Tom Brown
 Judge Brooker (1970–1975): Herb Vigran
 John Chapman (1971): Pat Hingle
 Miss Hannah (saloon owner; 1974–75): Fran Ryan

Music
The Gunsmoke radio theme song and later TV theme is titled "Old Trails", also known as "Boothill". The Gunsmoke theme was composed by Rex Koury. The original radio version was conducted by Koury. The TV version was thought to have been first conducted by CBS west coast music director Lud Gluskin. The lyrics of the theme, never aired on the radio or television show, were recorded and released by Tex Ritter in 1955. Ritter was backed on that Capitol record by Rex Koury and the radio Gunsmoke orchestra. William Lava composed the original theme music for television, as noted in the program credits.

Other notable composers included:
 Elmer Bernstein
 Jerry Goldsmith
 Bernard Herrmann
 Jerome Moross
 Franz Waxman

Format 
From 1955 to 1961, Gunsmoke is a half-hour show, retitled Marshal Dillon in syndication. It then went to an hour-long format. The series was retitled Gun Law in the UK. The Marshal Dillon syndicated reruns of half-hour episodes lasted from 1961 until 1964 on CBS, originally on Tuesday nights within its time in reruns.

Episodes

Syndication 
In syndication, the entire 20-year run of Gunsmoke is separated into three packages by CBS Television Distribution:
 1955–1961 half-hour episodes: These episodes are sometimes seen in their original format and sometimes in the Marshal Dillon format. When first-run, prime-time episodes of Gunsmoke expanded to an hour in fall 1961, CBS-TV reran the half-hour episodes as Marshal Dillon on the network on Tuesday nights from 1961 through 1964. These were later rerun in syndication. General syndication ended in the 1980s, but they do air occasionally on cable TV. Local stations would show the retitled Marshal Dillon version of the series, while the series under the original Gunsmoke title (with some episodes under the Marshal Dillon retitling) were seen in the late 1990s on TV Land and later Hallmark Channel. STARZ! Westerns Channel aired this version under the Marshal Dillon title. RetroPlex also aired two half-hour episodes under the original Gunsmoke title, although the episodes are advertised as Marshal Dillon, on Saturday nights from 8 to 9 pm Eastern time. MeTV announced that it would begin the half-hour black-and-white episodes beginning on January 2, 2017.
 1961–1966 one-hour black-and-white episodes: These episodes have not been widely seen in regular syndication since the 1980s, although selected episodes did air from the mid-1980s through the early 1990s on CBN Cable/The Family Channel, and later on Encore Westerns on a three-year contract that ended around 2006. As of January 2010, Encore Westerns was again airing the episodes. In October 2015, MeTV announced that it would begin airing the one-hour black-and-white episodes on October 26.
 1966–1975 one-hour color episodes: The last nine seasons of the Western, the most widely syndicated episodes of the entire series run, are still aired on some local stations, and nationally on TV Land and MeTV.

The program currently airs on four major venues: TV Land, which has carried the show since its inception in 1996, Encore Westerns, INSP, and Weigel Broadcasting's MeTV digital subchannel network. Individual stations such as KFWD in Dallas also carry the series in their markets. It has also been shown on satellite channel CBS Action in the UK, Ireland and Poland. The series also appears intermittently on MeTV's themed sister network Decades, which CBS holds a partial interest in; it appears on the schedule depending on the theme and year a particular day has.

Home media
In 2006, as part of Gunsmokes 50th anniversary on TV, selected episodes were released on DVD in three different box sets. Twelve episodes, from 1955 to 1964, were selected for the Gunsmoke: Volume I box set, and another twelve episodes, from 1964 to 1975, were selected for the Gunsmoke: Volume II box set. Both sets are also available as a combined single "Gift Box Set". A third unique DVD box set, known as Gunsmoke: The Directors Collection, was also released with 10 selected episodes from certain seasons throughout the series' 20-year history. All of these box sets are available on Region 1 DVD from Paramount Home Entertainment and CBS DVD.

Additionally, Paramount Home Entertainment and CBS DVD have released the series in its entirety on DVD for 13 years between 2007 and 2020 in Region 1 (all of the seasons except for season one and seasons sixteen through twenty were split into two volumes). A complete series box set was released on May 5, 2020. All DVDs have been released with English audio and close captioning from season 1 to 5 and starting season 6 English SDH.

TV movies 
In 1987, CBS commissioned a reunion movie titled Gunsmoke: Return to Dodge. James Arness and Amanda Blake returned in their iconic roles of Matt Dillon and Miss Kitty, with Fran Ryan returning as Kitty's friend and saloon-owner Hannah and Buck Taylor as Newly O'Brian. Doc Adams and Festus Haggen were not featured in the film. Milburn Stone had died 7 years earlier in 1980 and the role of Doc was not recast. Ken Curtis balked at the salary offer he received and said that he should be paid based on Festus's importance in the character hierarchy. The screenwriters responded to Curtis's absence by making Newly the new Dodge City marshal. The film, shot in Alberta, features a now-retired Marshal Dillon being attacked and a vengeful former rival returning to Dodge City to entrap him.

In 1990, the second telefilm, Gunsmoke: The Last Apache, premiered. Because Amanda Blake had died the year before, the writers revisited a 1973 episode for the movie. The episode was based on "Matt's Love Story". In the episode, Matt loses his memory and his heart during a brief liaison with "Mike" Yardner (played by Michael Learned, better known for playing Olivia in The Waltons). In the film, Learned returns as Mike, who reveals to Marshal Dillon that he is the father of their daughter, Beth (played by Amy Stock-Poynton) and asks him for help in saving her from a band on Apaches. Other films included Gunsmoke: To the Last Man (1992), Gunsmoke: The Long Ride (1993), and Gunsmoke: One Man's Justice (1994). Arness stars in all five made-for-television movies.

Reception

Primetime Emmy

1955 (presented March 17, 1956) 
 Best Action or Adventure Series – nominated (winner: Disneyland)

1956 (presented March 16, 1957) 
 Best Continuing Performance by an Actor in a Dramatic Series: James Arness – nominated (winner: Robert Young for Father Knows Best)

1957 (presented April 15, 1958) 
 Best Continuing Performance by an Actor in a Leading Role in a Dramatic or Comedy Series: James Arness – nominated (winner: Robert Young for Father Knows Best)
 Best Continuing Supporting Performance by an Actor in a Dramatic or Comedy Series: Dennis Weaver – nominated (winner: Carl Reiner for Caesar's Hour)
 Best Dramatic Series with Continuing Characters won
 Best Editing of a Film for Television: Mike Pozen for "How to Kill a Woman" – won
 Best Teleplay Writing (Half-Hour or Less): John Meston for "Born to Hang" – nominated (winner: Paul Monash for Schlitz Playhouse of Stars – "The Lonely Wizard")

1958 (presented May 6, 1959) 
 Best Actor in a Leading Role (Continuing Character) in a Dramatic Series: James Arness – nominated (winner: Raymond Burr for Perry Mason)
 Best Supporting Actor (Continuing Character) in a Dramatic Series: Dennis Weaver – won
 Best Supporting Actress (Continuing Character) in a Dramatic Series: Amanda Blake – nominated (winner: Barbara Hale for Perry Mason)
 Best Western Series – nominated (winner: Maverick)

1965–1966 (presented May 22, 1966) 
 Individual Achievements in Music - Composition: Morton Stevens for "Seven Hours to Dawn" – nominated (winner: Laurence Rosenthal for Michelangelo: The Last Giant)

1967–1968 (presented May 19, 1968) 
 Outstanding Achievement in Musical Composition: Morton Stevens for "Major Glory" (winner: Earle Hagen for I Spy – "Laya")
 Outstanding Performance by an Actor in a Supporting Role in a Drama: Milburn Stone – won

1969–1970 (presented by June 7, 1970) 
 Outstanding Achievement in Film Sound Editing: Norman Karlin and Richard E. Raderman – won (tied with Alex Bamattre, Michael Colgan, Douglas H. Grindstaff, Joe Kavigan, Bill Lee, and Josef E. Von Stroheim for ABC Movie of the Week: The Immortal)

Accolades
 In TV Guide′s April 17, 1993, issue celebrating 40 years of television, the all-time-best-TV programs were chosen. "No contest, this [Gunsmoke] was the TV western."
 Entertainment Weekly (February 19, 1999, issue) ranked the premiere of Gunsmoke as No. 47 in the "100 Greatest Moments in Television".
 Entertainment Weekly, in 1998, ranked Gunsmoke as No. 16 in The 100 Greatest TV Shows of all time.
 In a 1998 TV Guide poll of 50,000, Gunsmoke was ranked as CBS's best western and James Arness was ranked as CBS's best "Gunslinger".
 In 1997, the episode "The Jailer" was ranked No. 28 on TV Guides 100 Greatest Episodes of All Time.
 In 2002, TV Guide ranked Gunsmoke as No. 40 in the 50 greatest television shows of all time.
 In 2013, TV Guide ranked it as #27 on their list of the 60 Best Series.
 In 2019, the radio episode "The Cabin" was selected by the Library of Congress for preservation in the National Recording Registry for being "culturally, historically, or aesthetically significant".

Viewer reception 
Gunsmoke was TV's number-one-ranked show from 1957 to 1961, then expanded to one hour, and slipped into a decline. In 1967, the 12th season, CBS planned to cancel the series, but widespread viewer reaction (including a mention in Congress and the behind-the-scenes pressure from Babe Paley, the wife of CBS's longtime president William S. Paley) prevented its demise. On the Biography Channel's Behind The Scenes: Gilligan's Island (2002), Gilligan's Island producer Sherwood Schwartz states that Babe pressured her husband not to cancel Gunsmoke in 1967, so the network cut Gilligan's Island, instead. The show continued in its new time slot at 8 pm on Mondays. This scheduling move led to a spike in ratings that had it once again rally to the top 10 in the Nielsen ratings, which again saved the series when CBS purged most of its rural content in 1971. The series remained in the top 10 until the 1973–74 television season. In September 1975, though still ranking among the top-30 programs in the ratings, Gunsmoke was canceled after a 20-year run; it was replaced by Mary Tyler Moore spin-offs Rhoda and Phyllis (though Rhoda actually debuted while Gunsmoke was still airing first-run). Thirty TV westerns came and went during its 20-year tenure, and Gunsmoke was the sole survivor, with Alias Smith and Jones and Bonanza both leaving the airwaves  years earlier in January 1973.

Legacy

Spin-off
Gunsmoke has one spin-off series, Dirty Sally, a semicomedy starring Jeanette Nolan as an old woman and Dack Rambo as a young gunfighter, leaving Dodge City for California to pan for gold. The program lasted 14 weeks and aired in the first half of 1974, a year before Gunsmoke ended.

Longevity records 

The television series was the longest-running, primetime, live-action television series at 20 seasons, until September 2019 with the 21st-season premiere of Law & Order: Special Victims Unit. The original Law & Order, which was canceled in 2010 after tying Gunsmokes longevity record for a live-action, primetime television series, began its 21st season in February 2022. , it had the highest number of scripted episodes for any U.S. primetime, commercial, live-action television series. On April 29, 2018, The Simpsons surpassed the show for the most scripted episodes. Some foreign-made programs have been broadcast in the U.S. and contend for the position as the longest-running prime-time series. , Gunsmoke was rated fourth globally, after Doctor Who (1963–present), Taggart (1983–2010), and The Bill (1984–2010).

Gunsmoke is the last fictional primetime show that debuted in the 1950s to leave the air and only three shows from the 1960s that lasted past its final season in 1974–75.

Character longevity 
James Arness and Milburn Stone portrayed their Gunsmoke characters for 20 consecutive years, a feat later matched by Kelsey Grammer as the character Frasier Crane, but over two half-hour sitcoms (Cheers and Frasier). This feat would be surpassed by Mariska Hargitay, who has portrayed the character Olivia Benson on Law & Order: Special Victims Unit for over 23 consecutive years to date. George Walsh, the announcer for Gunsmoke, began in 1952 on the radio series and continued until the television series was canceled in 1975.

James Arness, Milburn Stone, Ken Curtis, Dennis Weaver, and Amanda Blake are all inductees of the National Cowboy & Western Heritage Museum.

In popular culture
Dodge City's Boot Hill Museum has a tribute to Gunsmoke, including set furniture from the 1960s and an old television tuned to the show. Signed photographs from the show's actors and other memorabilia are on display including a vest worn by Sam the bartender and a dress worn by Miss Kitty. In 2015, several of the surviving staff reunited at Wild West Fest in Dodge City, including stars Burt Reynolds, Buck Taylor, Jess Walton, Bruce Boxleitner, and writer Jim Byrnes.

German-American political philosopher and Plato scholar Leo Strauss was a fervent fan of Gunsmoke. Strauss "had one vice, or rather obsession. He would never miss a Saturday night TV program called Gunsmoke, a western about Marshall Matt Dillon in Dodge City, Kansas, and his many exploits. Strauss once said that the situation in the Old West was an excellent representation, unintentional or not, of what Hobbes meant by the state of nature."

In media
The Gunsmoke brand was used to endorse numerous products, including cottage cheese and cigarettes.

The Hartland toy company included an 8" (1/9th scale) plastic Matt Dillion figure and his horse Old Faithful Buck in their line of famous TV cowboys and horses during the 1950s.

Lowell Toy Manufacturing Corporation ("It's a Lowell Game") issued Gunsmoke as game No. 822. Other products include Gunsmoke puzzles,

Comics 
 Dell Comics published numerous issues of their Four Color comics series on Gunsmoke (including issues #679, 720, 769, 797, 844 and, in 1958–1962, #6–27).
 Gold Key Comics continued with issues #1–6 in 1969–70.
 A comic strip version of the series ran in British newspapers for several years under the show's UK title, Gun Law.
 Hardcover comic BBC Gunsmoke Annuals were marketed in Great Britain under the authority of the BBC which had broadcasting rights there.
 Gunsmoke comics in Spanish were published under the title Aventura la ley del revolver (Gun-Law Adventures).

Books 
 In 1957, Ballantine Books published a collection of short stories. Each story is based on a half-hour Gunsmoke episode. Although a photo of James Arness and the CBS TV logo are on the book cover, in at least one story Matt introduces Chester as "Chester Proudfoot", an indication that the stories are actually adapted from radio scripts.
 Whitman Books published
 Gunsmoke by Robert Turner in 1958, and
 Gunsmoke: "Showdown on Front Street" by Paul S. Newman in 1969 ... 
 In 1970, Popular Library published the following paperback book written by Chris Stratton:
 Gunsmoke
 In 1974, Award Books published the following paperback books written by Jackson Flynn based on the TV series:
 Gunsmoke #1: "The Renegades"
 Gunsmoke #2: "Shootout" Gunsmoke #3: "Duel at Dodge City" Gunsmoke #4: "Cheyenne Vengeance" In 1998, Boulevard Books published the following paperbacks written by Gary McCarthy based on the TV series:
 Gunsmoke Gunsmoke: "Dead Man's Witness" Gunsmoke: "Marshal Festus" A series of novels based upon the television series written by Joseph A. West with forewords by James Arness was published by Signet:
 Gunsmoke: "Blood, Bullets and Buckskin", January 2005
 Gunsmoke: "The Last Dog Soldier", May 2005
 Gunsmoke: "Blizzard of Lead", September 2005
 Gunsmoke: "The Reckless Gun", May 2006
 Gunsmoke: "Dodge the Devil", October 2006
 Gunsmoke: "The Day of the Gunfighter", January 2007
 "Gunsmoke: An American Institution, Celebrating 50 Years of Television's Best Western" Written by Ben Costello, Foreword by Jim Byrnes, and Introduction by Jon Voight and published by Five Star Publications, Inc.(now Story Monsters LLC) Published 1 edition (December 22, 2012), 

Independent e-book
 Gunsmoke: Battlefield Dodge, June 2015

Notes

 References 

 Further reading 
 John Dunning, On the Air: The Encyclopedia of Old-Time Radio, Oxford University Press, 1998. 
 SuzAnn Barabas & Gabor Barabas, Gunsmoke: A Complete History and Analysis of the Legendary Broadcast Series, McFarland & Company, Inc., 1990. 
 Bill Carter, "NBC Will Bring Back All Three Law & Order Shows", The New York Times, May 14, 2007.
 David R. Greenland, The Gunsmoke Chronicles: A New History of Television's Greatest Western'', BearManor Media, 2013.

External links 
 
 Listen to the entire Gunsmoke radio series
 Listen to the complete series of the radio version of Gunsmoke
 Zoot Radio, over 450 free Gunsmoke radio shows
 Listen to radio Gunsmoke at OldClassicRadio

1950s American radio programs
1950s Western (genre) television series
1955 American television series debuts
1960s American radio programs
1960s Western (genre) television series
1970s Western (genre) television series
1975 American television series endings
American radio dramas
American television series revived after cancellation
Black-and-white American television shows
CBS Radio programs
CBS original programming
Dell Comics titles
Dodge City, Kansas
English-language television shows
Gold Key Comics titles
 
Nielsen ratings winners
Period radio series
Primetime Emmy Award for Outstanding Drama Series winners
Radio programs adapted into television shows
Television franchises
Television series based on radio series
Television series by CBS Studios
Television shows adapted into comics
Television shows set in Kansas
United States Marshals Service in fiction
United States National Recording Registry recordings
Western (genre) radio series